Nick Rose may refer to:

 Nick Rose (American football) (born 1994), American football placekicker
 Nick Rose (lacrosse) (born 1988), Canadian lacrosse goaltender
 Nick Rose (runner) (born 1951), British track and field athlete

See also
 Nick Ross, British radio and television presenter